The Székely Freedom Day is a day celebrated by the Székely Hungarian minority of Romania. It is celebrated every 10 March in Târgu Mureș, but also in other parts of Székely Land and internationally. The holiday was created according to a decision of the Szekler National Council on 6 January 2012.

The same council said that this day (10 March) was chosen to commemorate the execution of Mihály Gálffy, Károly Horváth and János Török in 1854 at Târgu Mureș. They were Székely revolutionaries who, after the defeat in 1848, reorganized in Bucharest but were later caught and executed by the Austrian Empire's authorities.

There have been complaints as, on this day, there are often protests for the autonomy of the Székelys, which have caused conflicts between the protesters and the Romanian authorities. In addition, the holiday has been attended earlier as well by Hungarian far-right parties and groups such as Jobbik and the Sixty-Four Counties Youth Movement. Protests for the autonomy of the Székelys have also occurred in Hungary as a sign of support.

In 2020, due to the COVID-19 pandemic, events related to the Székely Freedom Day suffered restrictions. The same year, a collection of signatures that were to be sent to the European Citizens' Initiative was carried out. This was done mainly with the intention that the European Union (EU) would provide support to the Hungarian regional communities in Romania.

See also
Public holidays in Romania
Székely Autonomy Day
Hungarians in Romania

References

Day
Day
Day
Annual events in Romania
Winter events in Romania
Observances in Romania
March observances
Public holidays in Romania
2012 establishments in Romania